Pembroke Military Cemetery Malta is a burial ground for military personnel and their dependants. It is located close by the former St Patrick's Barracks (now St Clare's College) in the Pembroke Council area, on a minor road (Triq Adrian Dingli).

The first soldier buried at the cemetery was Sapper F Jarvis of 28 Company the Royal Engineers, who died on 5 May 1908. The majority of those interred and remembered at the cemetery are casualties of the two World Wars (but mainly the Second World War), many in communal graves. The last person buried at the site was a civilian Maria A Sammut who died on 15 September 2003. There are a total of 324 war graves associated with First and Second World Wars; the CWGC also maintains 273 non-war graves.

One group of graves and a memorial was erected to remember the Maltese servicemen of the Malta Fortress Squadron, Royal Engineers who died instantly and later of their injuries when their RAF Hastings airplane crashed at El Adem Airfield in Libya on 10 October 1961. Many other Maltese servicemen are buried in the cemetery.

Malta's CWGC Cemeteries became the centre of a controversy when the then Prime Minister of Malta Dom Mintoff was recorded as considering doing away with the island's war cemeteries in 1978; the threat was never carried out.

There are a number of CWGC graveyards and sites that are  cared for by the British Government through the auspices of the CWGC and somer of the larger collections of war graves can be found at the following locations:
 Pieta Military Cemetery
 Capucinni Naval Cemetery (also known as Kalkara Naval Cemetery)
 Imtarfa Military Cemetery
 Malta Memorial - Valletta (not graves but commemorating those with no known grave)

See also
 Pembroke Army Garrison
 Siege of Malta (World War II)

References

External links
 CWGC official website
 CWGC Guide for Malta
 British War Graves on Malta
 Find a Grave Pembroke Military Cemetery
 Australian War Memorial
 Pembroke Military Cemetery, Graves

British military memorials and cemeteries
World War II cemeteries
Pembroke, Malta
Cemeteries in Malta
1980 establishments in Malta
Commonwealth War Graves Commission cemeteries in Malta